Ole Enersen (born 6 September 2002) is a Norwegian football midfielder who plays for Strømsgodset.

He started his youth career in Åssiden IF, switching to Strømsgodset IF in 2016. He signed for the senior team in March 2021 and made his Eliteserien debut in May 2021 against Kristiansund. He scored his first goal in June 2022 against Sarpsborg 08.

References

2002 births
Living people
Sportspeople from Drammen
Norwegian footballers
Norway youth international footballers
Strømsgodset Toppfotball players
Eliteserien players
Association football midfielders